Meillionen railway station is a halt on the Welsh Highland Railway.  It opened to the public when the section of line between Rhyd Ddu and Beddgelert re-opened on 8 April 2009.

The station has been built to serve the popular the holiday cabins and campsite at Beddgelert, run by Forest Holidays. The railway provides a greener alternative to the car for visitors wishing to travel to Caernarfon, Porthmadog and, other points served in the Snowdonian National Park.

The name Meillionen  derives from the Afon Meillionen (Welsh  for Clover River) which runs under the railway a little to the north. Before completion, it was to be called Beddgelert Forest Halt but was renamed to comply with the company's policy of naming WHR halts in Welsh. After completion the halt's running in board, however, did have the sub-title Forest Camp Site. This subsequently changed in April 2018 and now displays the main title Meillionen only. Construction of the station started in 2006 and a waiting shelter was built in April 2009.

References

External links
Forest Holidays website
Beddgelert campsite website
The Welsh Highland Railway Project - official reconstruction site
Welsh Highland Railway
Rebuilding The Welsh Highland Railway - an independent site
Welsh Highland Railway Timetables
Video footage of Meillionen station

Heritage railway stations in Gwynedd
Welsh Highland Railway
Beddgelert
Railway stations built for UK heritage railways
Railway stations in Great Britain opened in 2009